"We're So Good Together" is a song written by Bob DiPiero, John Scott Sherrill and Annie Roboff, and recorded by American country music artist Reba McEntire.  It was released in September 2000 as the third single from the album So Good Together.  The song reached #20 on the Billboard Hot Country Singles & Tracks chart.

Chart performance

Notes

References

2000 singles
1999 songs
Reba McEntire songs
Songs written by Bob DiPiero
Songs written by John Scott Sherrill
Song recordings produced by David Malloy
MCA Nashville Records singles
Songs written by Annie Roboff